Nippoptilia pullum is a moth of the family Pterophoridae, that is known from Papua New Guinea.

References

Platyptiliini
Moths described in 2007
Endemic fauna of Papua New Guinea